Göttel or Gottel is a German language surname from the personal name Gottfried. Notable people with the name include:
 Enrique Gottel (1831–1875), German-Nicaraguan journalist, music composer and historian
 Moritz Göttel (1993), German footballer

References 

German-language surnames
Surnames from given names